Cabarrus College of Health Sciences is a private college for healthcare professions on the campus of Atrium Health Cabarrus in Concord, North Carolina. It is affiliated with Atrium Health, an integrated, nonprofit health system with more than 70,000 employees serving patients at 40 hospitals and more than 1,400 care locations.

Cabarrus College offers a mix of on-campus, online, and hybrid programs including one- to four-year programs for those who are new to healthcare and bachelor's and master's degrees for healthcare professionals seeking advanced study.  

It is the fastest-growing, least expensive private college in North Carolina and offers generous institutional aid for new students through its Cabarrus Cares Scholarship.  Established in 2021, the Cabarrus Cares Scholarship covers up to 100% of tuition and general fees for high school seniors from North Carolina who enroll full time directly from high school and demonstrate financial need.  

In August 2022, the college launched the Cabarrus Health Sciences Institute (CHSI), an early college high school. CHSI was developed in partnership with the Cabarrus County School system and Atrium Health.

History 
Cabarrus College of Health Sciences evolved from the Cabarrus County Hospital School of Nursing, founded by Louise Harkey in 1942 as a three-year diploma program to meet the demand for registered nurses during World War II.

February 2, 1942: Sixteen students enter the new nursing school.

1940s- 50s: Dormitory, recreation, auditorium and classroom space expansion to accommodate enrollment growth.

1963: National League for Nursing (NLN) awards accreditation to the school.

1973: Curriculum revision shortens program to two years; North Carolina Board of Nursing approves the school as the first two-year, hospital-based nursing diploma program in North Carolina.

1988: Nursing diploma program transformed to meet the standards for Associate Degree in Nursing.

1992: Officially renamed as the Louise Harkey School of Nursing to mark the school's 50th anniversary and to honor its founder.

1996: The Louise Harkey School of Nursing becomes the cornerstone of the new Cabarrus College of Health Sciences, renamed in preparation for launching new allied health programs.   

1997-2003: Medical Assistant, Surgical Technology, Nurse Aid, Occupational Therapy Assistant and Associate of Science programs added.

2004: The College partners with the Cabarrus Healthcare Foundation (formerly NorthEast Foundation) and the community to fund and build present facility on the campus of Atrium Health Cabarrus (formerly Northeast Medical Center/Carolinas HealthCare System NorthEast).

2005-2013: Additional programs added including Pharmacy Technology, certificate programs in Computed Tomography and Magnetic Resonance Imaging, Bachelor of Science degrees in Medical Imaging and Interdisciplinary Health Sciences, and an online RN-to-BSN degree.

2014: First master's degree (Occupational Therapy) program added.

2020: Master of Science in Nursing program enrolls first cohort.

2021: Bachelor of Science in Health Sciences Leadership & Development  program begins enrolling for spring 2022 semester.

2022:  Bachelor of Science degrees in Biomedical Sciences and in Community Health & Wellness begin enrolling for fall 2022 semester.  Cabarrus Health Sciences Institute (CHSI), an early college high school, launched in August.  Four-year Bachelor of Science in Nursing, Accelerated Bachelor of Science in Nursing and three-year Respiratory Therapy degrees begin enrolling for August 2023.

Academics 
Cabarrus College of Health Sciences is accredited by the Southern Association of Colleges and Schools Commission on Colleges (SACSCOC) The college offers diplomas, associate degrees, bachelor's degrees, and master's degrees in healthcare disciplines such as nursing, biomedical sciences, leadership and development, life sciences, medical assisting, medical imaging, occupational therapy, respiratory therapy and surgical technology.

References

External links
 Official website
 

Private universities and colleges in North Carolina
Nursing schools in North Carolina
Educational institutions established in 1942
Universities and colleges accredited by the Southern Association of Colleges and Schools
Education in Cabarrus County, North Carolina
Buildings and structures in Cabarrus County, North Carolina
1942 establishments in North Carolina